Leon Francis Riley Jr. (August 24, 1932 – June 9, 2011), best known as Lee Riley, was an American college and professional American football defensive back. He played collegiately at the University of Detroit Mercy, in the National Football League (NFL) for the Detroit Lions, the Philadelphia Eagles, and the New York Giants,  and in the American Football League (AFL) for the New York Titans.

Lee Riley was raised in Schenectady, New York where he attended St. Aloysius Academy (high school). He later attended St. Bonaventure University before transferring to the University of Detroit Mercy, where he played collegiate football. His father, Leon Riley Sr., played professional baseball and briefly played in Major League Baseball (MLB) for the Philadelphia Phillies during World War II before relocating to Rome, New York to assume role as player/manager of a  minor league team in 1940s to early 1950s. Lee played college football at the University of Detroit Mercy. He was the older brother of Pat Riley, currently president of the Miami Heat and former National Basketball Association (NBA) player, coach and broadcaster.

Lee Riley played eight-man football at St. Aloysius Academy. He then went to the U of Detroit and was drafted by the Detroit Lions. He was inducted into the Rome, New York Hall of Fame. In his last year of Professional Football he led the AFL in pass interceptions.

See also
 Other American Football League players

References

External links
 Riley's 1963 Fleer football card

1932 births
2011 deaths
Detroit Titans football players
American football defensive backs
Detroit Lions players
Philadelphia Eagles players
New York Giants players
New York Titans (AFL) players
Sportspeople from Omaha, Nebraska
Players of American football from Nebraska
Sportspeople from Rome, New York